Frank Davison may refer to:

 Frank Cyril Shaw Davison (1893–1960), Canadian-born writer
 Frank Davison (translator), British translator
 Frank Dalby Davison (1893–1970), Australian novelist and short story writer
 Frank B. Davison (1855–1935), considered one of the founding fathers of Texas City, Texas

See also
 Frank Davidson (1872–1951), English cricketer